Monckton's Gazeka, also called the Papuan Devil-Pig is an animal said to have been seen on Papua New Guinea in the early 20th century.  It is said to resemble a tapir or a giant sloth, having a long, proboscis-like snout, and some theories suggest it may be the descendant of an extinct marsupial belonging to the family Palorchestidae. 

Totally separate from that creature (to which the name 'Monckton's Gazeka' was confusingly applied by person(s) unknown) is the 'real' Gazeka, which was the creation of the English comic actor, George Graves, who introduced it as a bit of by-play in the musical, The Little Michus at Daly's Theatre, London, in 1905. A contemporary magazine described it thus: "According to Mr. Graves, the Gazeka was first discovered by an explorer who was accompanied in his travels by a case of whiskey, and who half thought that he had seen it before in a sort of dream." Graves's idea became a fad of the season and George Edwardes mounted a competition to encourage artists to give sketches of what the beast might look like. Charles Folkard won the competition, and the Gazeka suddenly appeared in the form of various items of novelty jewellery, charms, etc., and was taken up by Perrier, the sparkling water makers, for a series of advertisements. Children attending matinée performances at Daly's during the 1905–06 Christmas holidays were presented with "a materialized Gazeka, the Unique Toy of the Season". The Gazeka also featured in a special song and dance in the entertainment Akezag, at the London Hippodrome at Christmas, 1905.   

Firby-Smith, a schoolboy in P.G. Wodehouse's 1909 novel Mike, has the nickname "Gazeka" because of a supposed physical resemblance.

Notes

References
 An old postcard, on an Australia local government website

Melanesian legendary creatures